Sinankylosaurus (meaning "Chinese fused lizard") is a genus of dinosaur, originally described as an ankylosaur, from the late Cretaceous Period of Shandong, China. The genus contains a single species, Sinankylosaurus zhuchengensis, known from a nearly complete right ilium. The describers claim that the discovery of Sinankylosaurus further demonstrates the similarity between dinosaurs of eastern Asia and western North America.

Discovery and naming
Beginning in 1964, paleontologists conducted large-scale excavations in Zhucheng and discovered an abundant source of fossils; notably dinosaur fossils. ZJZ-183, the holotype specimen, was discovered with the Zhuchengtyrannus holotype in the Upper Cretaceous Wangshi Group (specifically the Hongtuya Formation) in Zhucheng, Shandong Province, China around 2010. The fossil was prepared during the following years and was later described in 2020.

Description
Because it is only known from an ilium, the external appearance of Sinankylosaurus remains unknown. Its describers noted similarities with other ankylosaur ilia, but a 2021 study did not consider it an ankylosaur and called it a nomen dubium.

Paleoecology
Sinankylosaurus is known from the Hongtuya Formation, part of the Wangshi Group of southern China. Other animals from this group include Sinoceratops, a ceratopsian, Shantungosaurus, a very common hadrosaurid to which most of the material has been assigned, Zhuchengtyrannus, an Asian tyrannosaurid related to Tarbosaurus, Zhuchengceratops, an Asian leptoceratopsid, and material tentatively assigned to Tyrannosaurus.

References 

Ankylosaurs
Campanian life
Late Cretaceous dinosaurs of Asia
Cretaceous China
Fossils of China
Paleontology in Shandong
Fossil taxa described in 2020
Ornithischian genera